Sudley Place is a historic mansion in Robertson County, Tennessee, U.S.. It was built in 1856 for Samuel Bowling Brown, a whiskey distiller. It was purchased by the Fuqua family in the 1930s. Democratic politician Jesse H. Jones, who served as the 9th United States Secretary of Commerce from 1940 to 1945, grew up in the house.

The house was designed in the Italianate architectural style. It has been listed on the National Register of Historic Places since January 11, 1974.

References

Houses completed in 1856
Houses on the National Register of Historic Places in Tennessee
Italianate architecture in Tennessee
Buildings and structures in Robertson County, Tennessee